is a Japanese term denoting an ancient division of the country. Kinai is a name for the ancient provinces around the capital Nara and Heian-kyō.  The five provinces were called go-kinai after 1760.

The name is still used to describe part of the Kansai region, but the area of the Kinai corresponds only generally to the land of the old provinces.

The region was established as one of the Gokishichidō ("Five provinces and seven roads") during the Asuka period (538-710). It consisted of Yamashiro, Yamato, Settsu, Kawachi, and Izumi provinces.

See also
 Comparison of past and present administrative divisions of Japan

Notes

References
 Nussbaum, Louis-Frédéric and Käthe Roth. (2005).  Japan encyclopedia. Cambridge: Harvard University Press. ;  OCLC 58053128

Regions of Japan

zh:五畿七道#五畿